Taylor Thomas Mueller (born September 20, 1988 in Kirkland, Washington) is a retired American soccer player.

Career
Mueller played college soccer at the University of Washington between 2007 and 2010, where he made 72 appearances and scored 2 goals. During his time at Washington, Mueller was named UW's Defensive MVP, Second-Team NSCAA All-Far West Region, Second-Team All-Pac-10 in 2010, Third-Team NSCAA All-Far West Region, Second-Team All-Pac-10 in 2010 and was Second-team All-Pac-10 honoree in 2009.

During his time at Washington, Mueller also played with Tacoma Tide in the USL Premier Development League in 2008.

Mueller was drafted 38th overall in the 2011 MLS Supplemental Draft by Portland Timbers, but was not signed by the club.

During 2011, Mueller played with USL Premier Development League club Washington Crossfire, where he made 9 league appearances.

Mueller signed with USL Professional Division club Charleston Battery in March, 2012. He made his professional debut on April 7, coming on as a 75th-minute substitute in a 2–1 victory over Richmond Kickers.

On November 9, 2021, Mueller announced his retirement from playing professional soccer.

References

External links
 Washington Huskies profile

1988 births
Living people
American soccer players
Association football defenders
Charleston Battery players
People from Sammamish, Washington
Portland Timbers draft picks
Seattle Sounders FC U-23 players
Soccer players from Washington (state)
Sportspeople from Kirkland, Washington
USL Championship players
USL League Two players
Washington Crossfire players
Washington Huskies men's soccer players
Tacoma Defiance players